The 1940 Chatham Cup was the 17th annual nationwide knockout football competition in New Zealand, and the last such competition before the suspension of the Chatham Cup due to World War II. The competition resumed in 1945 as hostilities were drawing to a close.

The competition was run on a regional basis, with regional associations each holding separate qualifying rounds. Teams taking part in the final rounds are known to have included Ponsonby, Waterside (Wellington), Hamilton Wanderers, Nomads (Christchurch), and Mosgiel.

The 1940 final
Waterside successfully defended the trophy for a second consecutive time, becoming the first team to win the trophy three times. The final also saw the first re-match since 1925, with the two teams having previously met in the 1938 final. Eight Waterside players (Sid Ward, Bob Bolton, Fred Hazel, Colin McCarthy, Tom Walker, Sonny Ward, Alf Longbottom, and Toby Janes) played in all three finals, and eight Mosgiel players played in both the 1938 and 1940 finals. Bolton, Janes, and Walker were each to gain a fourth final win in 1947.

Sonny Ward scored in the third consecutive final, taking his tally of cup final goals to four, and McCarthy added a hat-trick to his two goals in the previous season's final to take his overall total to a then-record five. The final was played in front of a record crowd of 8,000 spectators. Contemporary reports say that the final was the most one-sided in the cup's history up to that time. Despiute this, Mosgiel took an early lead with a second-minute goal from A. Sharpe. The equaliser came from Sonny Ward after 25 minutes, and from that point it became one-way traffic.  Walker put Waterside into the lead and McCarthy added another only two minutes later. McCarthy added a further goal to give the Wharfies a 3-1 half-time lead. In the second half McCarthy added his third and then crossed the ball from a corner which Longbottom headed in for Waterside's sixth. Mosgiel gained a late consolation goal through W. Rogers.

The aggregate of eight final goals remains a record, though it has been equalled on five occasions, in 1955, 1958, 1960, 1989, and in the first final of 1972 (a year in which the final required two replays).

Results

Semi-finals

Final

1941 to 1944
Owing to World War II, competition for the Chatham Cup was shelved from 1941 to 1944. Major reasons were the commitments of players to the war effort and the use of fuel to carry teams between game venues at a time when the use of fuel was severely restricted. In announcing the suspension of the competition in April 1941, NZFA chairman Frank Campbell stated: "The council is reluctant to see the Chatham Cup competition stopped, but in all the circumstances considers the postponement of the competition for this season in the best interests of the country and the game." The question of reviving the competition was put to the council each year during the war, but it was not until 1945 that it was revived. In 1944, a junior competition for schoolboys, known as the N.Z. Boys' Chatham Cup and run on similar regional lines to the senior competition, was contested by 13 teams.

References

Rec.Sport.Soccer Statistics Foundation New Zealand 1940 page

Chatham Cup
Chatham Cup
Chatham Cup